Luke Littler (born 21 January 2007) is an English professional darts player who currently plays in the World Darts Federation (WDF) events. He is the youngest player who won a match in the WDF World Darts Championship.

Career
Littler caused a stir at a young age with high averages and thus also raked in youth titles early on. In 2019, he won the England Youth Grand Prix and the Isle of Man Masters youth competition, where he was able to defend his title in 2020. The 2020 JDC tour featured two titles from The Nuke, who is also signed to partners program "Elite1" organised by Target. Littler won the youth title at the England Open in September 2021 and finished second in the British Pentathlon.

In November 2021, Littler won his first seniors title at the Irish Open defeating Barry Copeland by 6–2 in legs, and thus qualified for the 2022 WDF World Darts Championship at the age of 14. At the end of November, during the JDC MVG Masters tournament, he hit a nine-dart finish.

Littler won the JDC Super 16 in Milton Keynes at the end of January 2022, beat Eleanor Cairns in the final. In March 2022, he won the youth competition at the Isle Of Man Open and adavnced to the finals of the Isle of Man Classic. At the 2022 WDF World Darts Championship, Littler start as a seeded player from second round and won his first match against Ben Hazel 3–2 in sets. He was then beaten 0–3 in sets by Richard Veenstra.

During the Welsh Open warm-up tournament he hit a 121.86 average in one of his matches. A day later, he won another adult tournament in his career. In June 2022, he also won the Romanian Classic, beating Jelle Klaasen in the final by 5–1 in legs. At the 2022 WDF Europe Cup Youth, he won the gold medal in three men's competitions (singles, team and overall). His outstanding achievement was be defeating Archie Self in the finals of the singles competition by 6–1 in legs. In the pair competition, together with Archie Self, lost in the semi-finals by 1–4 in legs to Thomas Banks and Charlie Manby. 

At the end of September 2022, he was selected by the national federation to participate in the 2022 WDF Europe Cup. On the second day of the tournament, he advanced to the quarter-finals of the pairs competition where he played together with James Hurrell. They lost to Sam Cankett and Nick Kenny from Wales by 1–4 in legs. On the third day of the tournament, he advanced to the quarter-finals of the singles competition, lost to Andy Baetens by 4–5 in legs. In the team competition, he won the gold medal. In the points classification, as a representative of England, he also contributed to won a gold medal.

Littler won the JDC World Darts Championship 2022 in London at the end of December 2022, beating Harry Gregory by 5–0 in legs.

World Championship results

WDF
 2022: Third round (lost to Richard Veenstra 0–3) (sets)
 2023:

Performance timeline

References

2007 births
English darts players
British Darts Organisation players
Sportspeople from Warrington
Sportspeople from Runcorn
Living people